Raseiniai (Samogitian: Raseinē) is a city in Lithuania.

History

Grand Duchy of Lithuania

Raseiniai is one of the oldest communities in Lithuania – the name of the settlement was mentioned for the first time in 1253. Its name was mentioned in Chronicles of the 13th and 14th centuries under various names, including Rushigen, Rossyen, and Rasseyne. In 1253 Grand Duke Mindaugas ceded one part of the Samogitia territory, including some of the district around Raseiniai, to the Livonian Order, and the rest to the first bishop of Lithuania, Kristyan. In the 14th–18th centuries, Raseiniai was one of the most important towns in the Samogitia region.

At the end of the 14th century the city became important centre, and its representative participated with others from the region in signing the peace treaty of Königsberg in 1390. At the end of the 15th century, Raseiniai was granted Magdeburg Rights.

In the Polish–Lithuanian Commonwealth the city became important in the region. Government institutions were located there, and it served as a mercantile center for the area. In 1580 the local aristocrats met there in order to choose their representatives to the General Sejm (parliament) in Warsaw. From 1585 Raseiniai served as the permanent location of the county parliament. In 1792 city Magdeburg rights were renewed.

After the partitions of the Commonwealth

Following the third partition of the Commonwealth in 1795, Raseiniai was annexed by the Russian Empire and its city rights were annulled. In the Russian Empire, the town was the center of a Rossieny County. From 1801 to 1843, the county was in the Vilna Governorate, and from 1843 on it became part of the Kovno Governorate.

Historically, the chief articles of commerce were wood and grain for export. Because of its geographic position and distance from the railroad and the main highways, it became economically isolated. A fire in 1865 which almost destroyed the town also contributed to the city's decline in the latter half of the 19th century.

In 1831, an insurrection against Tsarist oppression began in Raseiniai. On March 26, the rebels took Raseiniai and formed a provisional district government. Within a few days the insurrection spread throughout the entire country – and was later known as the 1831 Rebellion.

The town long had a large Jewish presence. It was among the first Jewish communities established in Lithuania, and the city, which is known in Yiddish as Raseyn, became known as the "Jerusalem of Zamut." Jews continued to settle there in large numbers throughout the 17th century.

During most of the 19th century, the greater proportion of the town's population was Jewish and it was a center of the Jewish Haskalah (Enlightenment) movement. In 1842 the city had 7,455 inhabitants, the majority of whom were Jews. In 1866 the town had 10,579 inhabitants, of whom 8,290 were Jews. In 1897 the population of the district, excluding the town, was 221,731, of whom about 17,000 were Jews.  After World War I, however, the Jewish community was smaller. By 1926, 2,226 Jews lived in Raseiniai, and approximately 2,000 (40% of the general population) in 1939.

During most of the World War I, the town was occupied by the German army. In the spring of 1915, the Germans concentrated Army Group Lauenstein in the area of Tilsit, with three infantry and three cavalry divisions opposing one infantry division and units of border police and Russian volunteers. The Bavarian cavalry division swept through Raseiniai on April 14 en route to Šiauliai. Refugees from Raseiniai appeared in Šiauliai on the morning of April 15 warning of the German advance.

After World War I

When Lithuania regained Independence in 1918, Raseiniai became a district capital.

During World War II, Raseiniai was virtually ruined – approximately 90% of the buildings were destroyed. One survivor of the war is the Church of the Ascension of the Virgin Mary, which was built in 1782. The remains of the 17th–18th century monastery buildings also serve as a monument of Renaissance architecture.

Tourists invariably pause at The Samogitian statue in the central town square. The sculpture serves as a symbol of the Samogitia ethnographical zone – a strong man resolutely stepping forward after having tamed a bear (an allusion to the 1831 Rebellion). On the sides of the base there are three bas-reliefs depicting the struggle against Tsarist oppression. The sculpture, which is the work of Vincas Grybas (1890–1941), was erected in Raseiniai in 1933–1934.

World War II

In June 1941, near Raseiniai, roughly 20 Kliment Voroshilov tanks (KVs) of the Soviet 3rd Mechanized Corps met the assault of the 6th Panzer Division, with approximately 100 vehicles. A single KV-2 tank managed to hold off the German advance for a full day while being pummeled by a variety of antitank weapons, until finally the KV-2 ran out of ammunition and was knocked out. Raseiniai was captured on 23 June 1941 by troops of the German Army Group North. On 25 July 1941, the city was placed under the administration of the newly created Reichskommissariat Ostland. Raseiniai was recaptured on 9 August 1944 by Soviet troops of the 3rd Belorussian Front in the course of the Kaunas Offensive.

Famous places
Šiluva town. Where to find: John Paul II House, M. Jurgaitis a. 5, LT - 60433, Šiluva, Raseiniai district. Tel. 8 428 79200, 8 687 87124.
Betygala town. Where to find: Dubysos st. 8, Betygala, Raseiniai district. Tel. 8 615 26162, 8 616 50 251.
Raseiniai Region History Museum. Where to find: Muziejaus st. 3, Raseiniai. Tel./fax 8 428 51191, tel. 8,663,511.
Raseiniai racetracks. Where to find: Paraseinio st. 16, Dumšiškių village, Raseiniai district. Tel. 8 674 96385.
Eight-wheeled Museum. Where to find: Vyšnių st. 22, Nemakščiai, Raseiniai d. Tel. 8,687,49215.
Daugėliškės cognitive trail. Where to find: Daugėliškės forest, Ariogala sen., Raseiniai district. Tel. 8,618,34611.
Molavėnai mound complex. Kur rasti: Molavėnų k., Nemakščių sen., Raseinių r. Tel. 8 618 34611.

Twin towns — sister cities

Raseiniai is twinned with:

 Ķekava, Latvia
 Lubartów, Poland
 Mława, Poland
 Jászberény, Hungary
 Rapla, Estonia
 Unstrut-Hainich-Kreis, Germany
 Zhmerynka, Ukraine

References

Famous places in Raseiniai

External links

 
Cities in Lithuania
Cities in Kaunas County
Municipalities administrative centres of Lithuania
Duchy of Samogitia
Rossiyensky Uyezd
Raseiniai District Municipality